Mangelia martensi is a species of sea snail, a marine gastropod mollusk in the family Mangeliidae.

Description
The length of the shell varies between 13 mm and 22 mm.

Distribution
This marine species occurs off the Falkland Islands and in the Magellan Strait, Argentina at a depth between 855 m and 866 m.

References

  Strebel, Beiträge zur Kenntnis der Molluskenfauna der  Magalhaen-Provinz; Jena,Gustav Fischer,1904–1907

External links
 
  Tucker, J.K. 2004 Catalog of recent and fossil turrids (Mollusca: Gastropoda). Zootaxa 682:1–1295.

martensi
Gastropods described in 1905